Kirsten Polderman (born 16 February 2000) is a Dutch female artistic gymnast, representing her nation at international competitions. She competed at the 2015 European Youth Summer Olympic Festival.

References

2000 births
Living people
Dutch female artistic gymnasts
Gymnasts from The Hague
21st-century Dutch women